Zaffelare Heliport  is an airport located near Lochristi, East Flanders, Belgium. It has 1 grass helipad.

See also
List of airports in Belgium

References 

Airports in East Flanders
Lochristi